is a former Japanese rugby union player who played as a scrum-half. He spent his whole career playing for Toyota Verblitz in Japan's domestic Top League, playing over 75 times and captaining the side. His performances domestically earned him a call-up as a replacement player for the 2011 Rugby World Cup for Japan. He though did not make an appearance at the World Cup, or in any other matches for Japan.

References

External links
itsrugby.co.uk profile

1980 births
Living people
Japanese rugby union players
Rugby union scrum-halves
Toyota Verblitz players